Deir Abu Da'if is a Palestinian village in the West Bank, located 6 km east of the city of Jenin in the northern West Bank. According to the Palestinian Central Bureau of Statistics, the town had a population of  5,293 inhabitants in mid-year 2006.

History
Ceramics from the Byzantine era have been found here.

Ottoman era
In 1838, Edward Robinson noted  Deir Abu Da'if as one of a range of villages round a height, the other villages being named as Beit Qad, Fuku'a, Deir Ghuzal and Araneh.

In 1870 Victor Guérin noted it as a small village, south of Beit Qad, but less important than it. Guérin called the village for Ed-Deir.

In 1882 the PEF's Survey of Western Palestine described it: "A small village near the edge of the hills, on rising ground. The water supply is from cisterns. Olive- gardens exist on the north. The houses are of mud and stone."

British Mandate era
In the 1922 census of Palestine, conducted by the British Mandate authorities, the village had a population of 441; 434 Muslims and 7 Christians, where the Christians were all Orthodox, increasing in the 1931 census  to 598; 593 Muslims and 5 Christians, with 136 houses.

In 1944/5 statistics the population was 850, all Muslims, with a total of 12,906 dunams of land, according to an official land and population survey. Of this, 1,919 dunams were used for  plantations and irrigable land, 4,836  dunams were for cereals, while 30 dunams were built-up (urban) land.

Jordanian era
After the 1948 Arab-Israeli War, Deir Abu Da'if came under Jordanian rule.

The Jordanian census of 1961 found 1,191 inhabitants.

Post-1967
Deir Abu Da'if has been under Israeli occupation since the 1967 Six-Day War.

References

Bibliography

External links
 Welcome To Dayr Abu Da'if
   Deir Abu Da’if, welcome to Palestine
Survey of Western Palestine, Map 9:     IAA, Wikimedia commons

Towns in the West Bank
Jenin Governorate
Municipalities of the State of Palestine